The 2011 Movistar Open was a tennis tournament played on clay courts. It was the 16th edition of the Movistar Open, and was part of the ATP World Tour 250 series of the 2011 ATP World Tour. It took place at the Estadio San Carlos de Apoquindo in Santiago, Chile from January 30 through February 6, 2011.

ATP entrants

Seeds

 Rankings are as of January 17, 2011

Other entrants
The following players received wildcards into the singles main draw:
  Paul Capdeville
  Nicolás Massú
  Felipe Rios

The following players received entry from the qualifying draw:

  Jorge Aguilar
  Facundo Bagnis
  Ricardo Hocevar
  Caio Zampieri

Finals

Singles

 Tommy Robredo defeated  Santiago Giraldo, 6–2, 2–6, 7–6(7–5)
It was Robredo's 1st title of the year and 10th of his career.

Doubles

 Marcelo Melo /  Bruno Soares defeated  Łukasz Kubot /  Oliver Marach, 6–3, 7–6(7–3)

References

External links
Official website

2011
Movistar Open
Movistar Open